The Bonasila River (Deg Xinag: Ngidegh Srixno') is a  tributary of the Yukon River in the U.S. state of Alaska. It heads in the Nulato Hills and flows generally southeast to the Bonasila Slough, an anabranch of the larger river.

See also
List of rivers of Alaska

References

Rivers of Alaska
Rivers of Yukon–Koyukuk Census Area, Alaska
Tributaries of the Yukon River
Rivers of Unorganized Borough, Alaska